Sobhita Dhulipala (born 1992) is an Indian actress who works primarily in Hindi, Malayalam, Tamil and Telugu films. She won the Femina Miss India Earth 2013 title at Femina Miss India 2013 pageant and represented India at Miss Earth 2013. Dhulipala made her acting debut in Anurag Kashyap's thriller film Raman Raghav 2.0 (2016) and rose to fame playing a leading role in the Amazon Prime Video drama series Made in Heaven (2019).

Dhulipala went on to appear in the Telugu films Goodachari (2018) and Major (2022), the Malayalam films Moothon (2019) and Kurup (2021), and the Tamil film Ponniyin Selvan: I (2022).

Early life and education 
Sobhitha Dhulipala was born in 1992, in Tenali, Andhra Pradesh, India into a Telugu speaking family to Merchant Navy engineer Venugopal Rao and primary school teacher Santha Kamakshi. She grew up in Visakhapatnam as a studious child who only cared for “being well-read, good in studies, school captain”. Desiring broader horizons beyond her home city, she moved to Mumbai alone at the age of sixteen  and later attended H.R. College of Commerce and Economics in University of Mumbai. She is also a trained classical dancer in Bharatanatyam and Kuchipudi. Dhulipala was crowned the Navy Queen at the annual Navy Ball pin 2010.

Career

Modelling (2013) 

A college friend of Dhulipala's was interning at the Miss Office and suggested she audition for the upcoming pageant. Describing herself as an “uncool geek” and stating she wished for validation, Dhulipala entered with the intentions of only clearing the first round to prove to her friends she could. Upon passing the auditions, she decided to continue with the rounds. After winning Femina Miss India South 2013 title, a zonal pageant of Femina Miss India, Dhulipala attained an auto-entry into the top 23 of the 50th year of Femina Miss India and became the first runner-up. She was also awarded Miss Stylish Hair, Miss Adventurous and Miss Fashion Icon, Miss Talent, Miss digital Diva. Subsequently, she represented India in Miss Earth 2013 in the Philippines, but could not finish in the top 20, instead landing sub-titles of Miss Photogenic, Miss Beauty for a cause, Miss Talent and Miss Beautiful face. She also featured in Kingfisher Calendar 2014.

Acting career (2016–present)
Dhulipala made her film debut with Anurag Kashyap's Raman Raghav 2.0 in 2016. and also signed a three-film deal with Kashyap's production company Phantom Films in July 2016. The film premiered at the Director's Fortnight at Cannes Film festival 2016, where she was nominated by critics for best supporting performance. In early August 2016, she signed two films, Kaalakaandi directed by Akshat Verma and Chef directed by Raja Menon, both starring opposite Saif Ali Khan.

In 2018, Dhulipala appeared in her first Telugu film Goodachari starring Adivi Sesh. She also starred as one of the leads in the Amazon Prime original series Made In Heaven. In 2019, she appeared in a pivotal role in Bard of Blood, an Indian fictional spy thriller  Netflix web television series based on the 2015 espionage novel of the same name as an intelligence agency operative. Dhulipala made her debut in Malayalam cinema with the 2019 Geetu Mohandas directorial-feature Moothon alongside Nivin Pauly. She featured in the Dulquer Salmaan starrer Kurup (2021). 

In 2022, Dhulipala had a supporting role in the Hindi-Telugu biographical action film Major, starring Adivi Sesh as Sandeep Unnikrishnan. She also appeared in Mani Ratnam's period film Ponniyin Selvan: I.

Filmography

Films

Television
All shows are in Hindi unless otherwise noted.

Awards and nominations

Notes

References

External links 

 
 

1992 births
Living people
Indian film actresses
Indian web series actresses
2013 beauty pageants in India
Miss Earth India delegates
Indian beauty pageant winners
Femina Miss India winners
Miss Earth 2013 contestants
People from Tenali
Actresses in Hindi cinema
Actresses in Telugu cinema
Actresses in Malayalam cinema
Actresses in Tamil cinema
Actresses from Andhra Pradesh
Female models from Andhra Pradesh
Telugu actresses
21st-century Indian actresses